The Hustler River is a river of Minnesota.  Hustler Lake is a small body of water on the river and is one terminus of the Sioux–Hustler Trail.

See also
List of rivers of Minnesota

References

External links
Minnesota Watersheds
USGS Hydrologic Unit Map - State of Minnesota (1974)

Rivers of St. Louis County, Minnesota